The CZ 100 is a semi-automatic handgun, introduced in 1995 by Česká Zbrojovka . It was the first of CZs weapons to use synthetic materials. It has a sister model, CZ 110, which has a smaller magazine capacity (7 rounds 9mm or 6 rounds .40).

The "CZ100" was reintroduced in 2000 and called the "CZ100B". It is identical in most ways, except for adjustable sights, trigger and firing mechanism work, and cleaner machining of the main slide and exterior steel.

Features
The CZ 100 has a number of important handgun features. It is hammerless DAO (double action only), meaning that the firing system is under no tension unless the trigger is pulled. There is an automatic firing pin safety device. It is constructed for one-handed cocking, with a protrusion on the slide behind the ejection port intended for pushing against the edge of a fixed surface. The gun uses the usual Browning cam for action. The .40 S&W version has a simple compensator. The tactical rail allows for the attachment of a laser or light, but only proprietary models.

Stats
Cartridge: 9mm Parabellum or .40 S&W
Length: 177 mm (6.96")
Barrel: 95 mm (3.74")
Weight: 645 g (22.75 oz)
Height: 130 mm (5.11")
Width: 31 mm (1.22")
Sight radius: 148 mm (5.82")
Rifling: 6 grooves, right-hand
Magazine: 13-round (9mm) or 10-round (.40) detachable box
Production years: 1995–present
Manufacturer: Česká Zbrojovka a.s., Uherský Brod, Czech Republic

Users

 : 10 pistols were bought in 1998 for Ministry of Internal Affairs. These pistols used by police tactical units.

References

Sources
CZ 100 at world.guns.ru

Semi-automatic pistols of Czechoslovakia
9mm Parabellum semi-automatic pistols
.40 S&W semi-automatic pistols
Weapons and ammunition introduced in 1995